History of Portland may refer to:

 History of Portland, Maine
 History of Portland, Oregon